Lion Island can refer to:

Places
Lion Island (New South Wales), an island in Broken Bay north of Sydney, Australia
Lion Island (Old Windsor), an uninhabited island in the River Thames, England
Lion Island, Palmer Archipelago, Antarctica
Lion Island, Géologie Archipelago, Antarctica
Lion Island, Victoria Land, Antarctica

Other uses
 Lion Island (band), a musical ensemble from Brisbane, Australia

See also
 Shi Islet (獅嶼), or Lion Islet, Lieyu Township, Kinmen County (Quemoy), Fujian (Fukien), Republic of China (Taiwan)
 Pulau Ujong